Immaculate (Spanish:Inmaculada) is a 1950 Mexican drama film directed by Julio Bracho and starring Rosario Granados, Carlos López Moctezuma and Eduardo Noriega.

The film's sets were designed by the art director Jesús Bracho.

Cast
 Rosario Granados as Consuelo  
 Carlos López Moctezuma as Jorge Villagran  
 Eduardo Noriega as Luis Angel  
 Eva Martino as Lucia  
 Prudencia Grifell as Dona Rosa  
 Delia Magaña as Severina  
 Mimí Derba as madre de Luis Angel  
 Tana Lynn as La seductora  
 Maruja Grifell as Madame  
 Lupita Llaca as Rosalia 
 Elda Peralta as Guillermina Perea  
 Diana Ochoa as Merceditas, tendera  
 Armando Arriola as Nacho  
 Armando Velasco as Doctor  
 Luis Mussot as Don Carlos  
 Enrique Díaz 'Indiano' as Doctor  
 Diana Bracho as Rosalía  
 Ismael Pérez as Monchito  
 Juan Orraca 
 Nicolás Rodríguez 
 Julieta Rubio
 Emma Fink
 Elda Martinez 
 Mariano Requena 
 Jesús Valero 
[Roger Aaron Brown

References

Bibliography 
 Rogelio Agrasánchez. Cine Mexicano: Posters from the Golden Age, 1936-1956. Chronicle Books, 2001.

External links 
 

1950 films
1950 drama films
Mexican drama films
1950s Spanish-language films
Films directed by Julio Bracho
Films scored by Manuel Esperón
Mexican black-and-white films
1950s Mexican films